Post Office Telecommunications was set up as a separate department of the UK Post Office, in October 1969. The Post Office Act 1969 was passed to provide for greater efficiency in post and telephone services; rather than run a range of services, each organisation would be able to focus on their respective service, with dedicated management. By law, the Post Office had the exclusive right to operate the UK national telecom network, (although since 1914 had licensed Hull City Council to operate its own local telephone network, Kingston Communications) and limited ability to license other providers' services and equipment. The National Telephone Company controlled most of telephony in Britain before the 1880 ruling on the Telegraph Act 1869 mandated a nationalised service – which was instated in 1911. The 1869 Telegraph Act granted this monopoly over communications and it was confirmed in 1880 that this Act included telephony even though the telephone had not been invented when the Act was first conceived. Post Office engineers in the inter-war period had considerable expertise in both telecommunications and hearing assistive devices.

The 1970s was a period of great expansion for the Post Office. Most exchanges were modernised and expanded, and many services, such as STD and international dialling were extended.  By the early 1970s, subscribers in most cities could dial direct to Western Europe, the US, and Canada; by the end of the decade, most of the world could be dialled direct. The System X digital switching platform was developed, and the first digital exchanges began to be installed. The Post Office also procured their own fleet of vans, based on the Commer FC model. However, progress came at a price. Investment was stifled by public spending limits, and long waiting lists for telephone lines developed, sometimes for years.

In 1979 the Conservatives decided that telecommunications should be fully separated from the Post Office. By 1981, the British Telecommunications Act was passed and the service became British Telecom in October that year.

Historical documents
Records of the Post Office Corporation (Telecommunications division) 1969-1981 and its predecessors (including Post Office Telegraph and Telephone Service 1864-1969 and some private telegraph and telephone companies) are Public Records, and are held by BT Archives.

See also
 BT Archives
 EPSS
 Packet Switch Stream
International Packet Switched Service
 UK telephone area codes (STD codes)

References

External links
 BT Archives
 BT Archives online catalogue

History of telecommunications in the United Kingdom
BT Group
Former nationalised industries of the United Kingdom
Organizations established in 1969
1969 establishments in the United Kingdom